Denise Carter (born July 31, 1950), also known as Denise Carter-Triolo, is an American former tennis player.  She was ranked eighth in the United States in 1969, tenth in 1970, and tenth again in 1971.  She reached the third round of the U.S. Open in 1968 and 1969 and the third round of Wimbledon in 1969, 1970, and 1971.

She is the daughter of tennis player Nick Carter.

References

External links 
 
 

American female tennis players
1950 births
Living people
21st-century American women